Mama Baer (born Andrea Katharina Ingeborg Göthling; 29 October 1981) is a German sound recordist of noise music and post-industrial music. She is a filmmaker and visual artist at Flensburg. She has had solo and group art exhibitions around the world, and her short films have been presented at several film festivals.

Early life 
Mama Baer was born Andrea Katharina Ingeborg Göthling on October 29, 1981.

Career 
She works as a sound recordist in the field of Noise and Post-industrial music, visual artist, and filmmaker at Flensburg. She often works together with her husband Kommissar Hjuler as Kommissar Hjuler und Frau. A self-taught artist, she began making music in 1999 and visual art in 2006. Her art is in the field of neo dada and art brut.

Inspector Hjuler worked until 2011 with a figure made of bread dough and dried, which he called bread cat and for which he created his own abstract universe. The assemblages created behind Plexiglas are intended as a comic-like sequence of individual events. In this way, Commissioner Hjuler developed a religion and a complete state and social system around this fictitious character, which repeatedly creates a critical reference to people in an absurd way. Brotkatze ends up in the war against the superior enemy Votzekatze, a collage of three vaginas as a silhouette of the three-dimensional Brotkatze. The Marketingclub Kärnten and the Kleine Zeitung Österreich voted his bread cat work Enter Konsum the winner of an art competition at the Innovation Congress 2010.

When he was in charge of the police, he regularly caused offense with his actions, so that until he left the police service, written orders or prohibitions with countersignatures were issued several times. Together with Albrecht/d. he regularly made leporellos from this correspondence. Points of contention were the use of uniforms and official correspondence in assemblages, the wearing of uniforms in short films, and the later use of tape recordings (Martinshorn) from mission trips in music recordings. Particular points of contention were the reshooting of a complete episode of the Raumpatrouille Orion series with uniformed colleagues and the refusal to read an official standard assessment in order to then declare it a work of art as an objet trouvé with the status "unread". Unlike Commissioner Hjuler, the Schleswig-Holstein Ministry of the Interior did not see the fact that a document was not read as processing in the artistic sense.  

Mama Baer has a huge amount of music releases available at independent labels like Ultra Eczema, Intransitive Recordings, Nihilist Records, Obskyr Records and others. She shares albums with Bomis Prendin, Franz Kamin, Philip Krumm, Wolf Vostell, and others.

Performance 
Kommissar Hjuler und Frau performed at festivals such as Colour out of Space Festival, Brighton, 2009, Zappanale, Bad Doberan, 2010, Incubate (festival) Nijmegen, 2010, and at artists' venues like Morden Tower, Café Oto or Mary Bauermeister's performance space. They performed live with Jan van den Dobbelsteen and Danielle Lemaire, Eugene Chadbourne, John Wiese, Heather Leigh Murray, Clive Graham, and others.

Art 
She has presented in solo and group art exhibitions around the world. In 9 November 2009 she joined the NO!art movement. 

German novelist Peter Rathke presented Mama Baer as a character in his novel Im Knast mit Kommissar Hjuler und Mama Baer.

Mama Baer was played by Kathleen Gregory in an incomplete short film by Fred Wilder. Kommissar Hjuler and Mama Baer wrote most of the film's music.

References

External links
 Artist's website
 No!art website
 Gallery
 What happened to the happening? 
 Discogs list of Mama Baer 
 Discogs list of Kommissar Hjuler und Frau 
 Fred Wilder 

German contemporary artists
German experimental musicians
German experimental filmmakers
German industrial musicians
German installation artists
Place of birth missing (living people)
Language poets
German multimedia artists
Neo-Dada
Noise musicians
German performance artists
German sound artists
Women sound artists
German video artists
Living people
1981 births
People from Flensburg
Film people from Schleswig-Holstein